Lethenty railway station was a railway station in Lethenty, Aberdeenshire on the short rural branch line from Inverurie to Old Meldrum serving the rural community of the area.

History
The railway station opened on 26 June 1856 and closed to passengers on 2 November 1931. The date for opening is also given as 1 October 1856.

The station continued to be used for freight traffic until official closure on 6 February 1961.

The station lay 2.25 miles from Inverurie In the early 20th century the station and the platform were rebuilt using stone for the latter and wood for the former. It had a single siding that lay beyond the level crossing that served the Lethenty meal mill via a waggon turntable.

The station lay at 195 feet above sea level on a section of the single track line, that for down trains presented a climb that was not too challenging, but it was continuous with Fingask at 244 feet and Oldmeldrum at 264 feet. No signals or passing loop were present.

Lethenty had facilities for parcels, freight, horseboxes, and livestock. It had no crane and did not serve private carriages or furniture vans. The staff originally consisted of a stationmaster and porter. In 1915 milk churns, parcels and freight traffic were quite regular.

The platform survives however the station building has been demolished. A railway cottage still stands nearby.

Previous services
All trains stopped at Lethenty, unlike the service at Fingask. The line had no Sunday service. Tickets were issued from Lethenty in 1937 and 1938 despite the 1931 closure, however these may represent tickets for onward travel from Inverurie issued as the station was still staffed however it could relate to passengers travelling in the freight train goods van that was permitted at the time. The last railtour to visit the line was in June 1965 with a two car DMU.

References

Notes

Sources
 
 
 McLeish, Duncan (2014). Rails to Banff, Macduff and Oldmeldrum. Pub. GNoSRA. .

Disused railway stations in Aberdeenshire
Railway stations in Great Britain opened in 1856
Railway stations in Great Britain closed in 1931
Former Great North of Scotland Railway stations
1856 establishments in Scotland
1931 disestablishments in Scotland